Selnica is a village and municipality in Međimurje County, in northern Croatia.

History
In year 1334 Selnica was recorded as Catholic parish named Sancti Marci in Census of parishes of Zagreb Diocese. Charter issued in year 1478 mentions villages Zenth Mark and Zelnycz.

In the 1850s, oil was discovered in the Selnica. Exploitation of the two oil fields began in the late 19th century and lasted until the 1950s. 

Municipality of Selnica was established in year 1992.

Geography

Selnica is located in part of Međimurje called Gornje Međimurje. Village of Selnica, municipality centre, is about 14 kilometres northwest from Čakovec, and some 100 kilometres north of Zagreb. The municipality covers an area of 24.84 km2.

Geomorphologically, the municipality can be divided into two parts.  The southern part consists of low hills called Međimurske Gorice, while the northern part consists of alluvial plain of the river Mur.

Demographics

In the 2011 census, the municipality had a population of 2,991 in 10 villages. Selnica is experiencing slight population decline since the 1960s. 

The majority of inhabitants are Croats making up 99% of population.

Settlements

Culture

In Selnica is located the privately-owned Oldtimer museum Šardi with collection of historic cars, motorcyles, tractors, and other vehicles.

Gallery

References

Municipalities of Croatia
Populated places in Međimurje County